Banjarangkan is a district of Klungkung Regency, Bali, Indonesia. It is located 6 km from Semarapura or about one hour from Denpasar. Its area is approximately 45.73 km2, and it had a population of 37,115 at the 2010 Census and 44,431 at the 2020 Census.

Subdivisions of Banjarangkan consist of 13 villages, 55 dusun and 26 traditional villages (desa adat).

Places of interest
Places of interest in Banjarangkan include Pura Kentel Gumi, Tegal Besar beach and Lepang, a beach with black sand and a view of Nusa Penida Island, where turtles can be seen to lay eggs.

References

Districts of Bali
Klungkung Regency